Guy Robert Russell (born 28 September 1967) is an English former professional footballer and manager who played in the Football League for Birmingham City and Carlisle United. He played as a centre forward.

Life and career
Russell was born in Shirley, West Midlands. As a junior, he played for Knowle North Star before joining Birmingham City as a YTS trainee in 1984. He turned professional two years later. He made his debut as a 17-year-old, on 19 March 1985, playing 90 minutes as Des Bremner's deputy in a Second Division game at home to Manchester City which finished goalless. He made one substitute appearance in the following season in the First Division, and spent the latter part of the 1987–88 season on loan at Carlisle United, where his two goals from 12 games failed to prevent the club's relegation from the Third Division. Russell made another ten first-team appearances for Birmingham, but failed to score despite being a regular scorer in the junior teams, and in April 1989 he moved to Finland to play for Kemin Palloseura. Following their relegation, he returned to England and joined Moor Green of the Southern League.

Russell was to remain with Moor Green for eleven years, and captained the team. In April 1999, by which time he had 135 goals from 430 appearances in all competitions, he was awarded a testimonial match between a Birmingham City All-Stars team and their Middlesbrough counterparts. Manager Bob Faulkner later described him as "one of the Moor Green greats".

In 2000 Russell joined Solihull Borough as a player, later becoming assistant manager and in March 2004 taking over as manager. After nearly a year in post, Russell resigned, citing the time commitment and the frustration involved in managing a club unable to compete financially.

References

1967 births
Living people
Sportspeople from Solihull
English footballers
Association football forwards
Knowle F.C. players
Birmingham City F.C. players
Carlisle United F.C. players
Kemi City F.C. players
Moor Green F.C. players
Solihull Borough F.C. players
English Football League players
Southern Football League players
English football managers
English expatriate footballers
Expatriate footballers in Finland